Lisar (also Romanized as Līsār and Lissar; also known as Līssār Bāzār) is a city and capital of Kargan Rud District, in Talesh County, Gilan Province, Iran.  At the 2006 census, its population was 2,599, in 679 families.

Language 
Linguistic composition of the city.

References

Populated places in Talesh County

Cities in Gilan Province

Azerbaijani settlements in Gilan Province